Michael Curry may refer to:

Michael Curry (basketball) (born 1968), American basketball player and coach
Michael Curry (bishop) (born 1953), Presiding Bishop of the Episcopal Church
Michael Curry (puppet designer) (born 1967), American production designer
Michael Curry (rugby union) (born 1994), New Zealand rugby union player
Mickey Curry (born 1956), drummer

See also
Michael Currie (disambiguation)